DB1 may refer to:

 Aston Martin 2-Litre Sports, an English sports car.
 Dark Beginning 1, a Yu-Gi-Oh! Trading Card Game booster pack.
 db1.mdb is the default file name for databases created in Microsoft Access versions up to 2003.